Parornix compressa is a moth of the family Gracillariidae. It is known from Afghanistan and Pakistan.

References

Parornix
Moths of Asia
Moths described in 1990